İbrahim Sirkeci (born 1972, Izmir, Turkey) is a British Turkish social scientist, Professor at various British universities. He previously worked at the European Business School London, Regent's University London, and was the Director of Regent's Centre for Transnational Studies.

Biography 
Sirkeci received his BA in Political Science and Public Administration from Bilkent University, Ankara and PhD in Human Geography from the University of Sheffield.

Prior to joining the European Business School London of Regent's University London, he worked as a Leverhulme Research Fellow at the Centre for the Study of Ethnicity and Citizenship, University of Bristol, and also as assistant professor at a private university in Ankara, Turkey.

He is editor of several international peer-reviewed scholarly journals including Migration Letters, Transnational Marketing Journal, and Goc Dergisi. He authored several books including Cultures of Migration published by University of Texas Press in 2011, and The Environment of Insecurity in Turkey and the Emigration of Turkish Kurds to Germany, was published by Edwin Mellen Press in 2006.

Work 
Sirkeci's research focuses on human mobility, remittances, transnational marketing, marketing of higher education, transnational consumers, ethnicity, segmentation, segregation and labour markets, conflict, international migration with particular reference to minorities in the UK, Turkish, Kurdish migration to Germany, Turkey and Iraq.

He has written widely on transnational marketing, international migration, internal migration, population movements, labour market, segregation, ethnic conflict, minorities, Turks, Kurds, and remittances. Sirkeci also writes a weekly column for Turkish daily newspaper Birgun. 
His research is published in journals including Environment and Planning A, Sociological Research Online, Ethnic and Racial Studies, International Migration, and Journal of Biosocial Science., and Population Review

Bibliography

 
 

 (bilingual: English and Turkish).
(in Turkish)

See also 
 British Turks
 List of British Turks

References

External links 
Direct Marketing, editorial advisory board
Professor Ibrahim Sirkeci's talk at European Parliament
Population Review, scientific review board
Home page at EBSL
Ibrahim Sirkeci, The Environment of Insecurity in Turkey and the Emigration of Turkish Kurds to Germany, New York, Edwin Mellen Press, 2006 
BirGün columnists
Ibrahim Sirkeci Londra Yazıları YOKSULLAR VE İŞÇİLER KONUŞULMADI, 28 Eylül 2008

1972 births
Living people
Demographers
Turkish columnists
Turkish business theorists
Turkish non-fiction writers
Management scientists
Turkish social scientists
Turkish political scientists
Bilkent University alumni